Monsempron-Libos is a commune in the Lot-et-Garonne department in south-western France. Monsempron-Libos station has rail connections to Périgueux and Agen.

See also
Communes of the Lot-et-Garonne department

References

Monsempronlibos